Cruciamentum are an English death metal act formed in 2005. The band members originate from the cities of Stoke-on-Trent, Birmingham, and London in the United Kingdom. The band was created as a musical quartet with several lineup changes during their career. Cruciamentum has so far released one full-length EP, a split 7-inch with Vasaeleth, and a demo recording.

Members 

 D.L. – guitar, vocals

Former members 
 S.H. – bass
 D.T. – drums
 M.L. – guitar
 A.K. – vocals
 O.S. – vocals
 B.C. – bass, vocals 
 D.B.–H. – drums
 R.C. – guitar

Discography 
 Convocation of Crawling Chaos (2009)
 Eroding Chaos unto Ascendant Flesh – split with Vasaeleth (2011)
 Engulfed in Desolation (2011)
 Charnel Passages (2015)

References

External links
 Cruciamentum on Facebook

Musical groups established in 2005
2005 establishments in England
English death metal musical groups
Musical groups from London
Musical quartets